Green Lake is a large stretch of freshwater lake located in the state of Maine, United States. Green Lake lies west of Route 180 and east of U.S. Route 1A and the Downeast Scenic Railroad. It is a tourist destination due to its sense of remoteness and natural environment.

Green Lake also contains a National Fish Hatchery, which is a part of the USFWS Atlantic salmon restoration and recovery program for Gulf of Maine rivers.

External links
 Green Lake National Fish Hatchery

Lakes of Hancock County, Maine
Ellsworth, Maine
Lakes of Maine